Wright's test is a clinical sign in which the radial pulse weakens or disappears when the arm is abducted and externally rotated. It occurs in some patients with thoracic outlet syndrome.

See also 
 Adson's sign

References 

Symptoms and signs: musculoskeletal system